Television in Poland was introduced in 1937. It was state owned, and was interrupted by the Second World War in 1939. Television returned to Poland in 1952 and for several decades was controlled by the communist government. Colour television was introduced in Poland in 1971. Private television stations in Poland appeared around the time of the fall of communism, with PTV Echo (once a member of the local channels of Polonia 1) becoming the first private station in Poland (and in the former Eastern Bloc).

Polish programming

Universal Channel 
 Arrow
 A Touch of Frost
 Californication
 Castle
 CSI: Miami
 Dexter
 Futurama
 Hawaii Five-0
 Law & Order
 Monk
 Psych
 Royal Pains
 Scandal
 Sleeper Cell
 Stargate Universe
 The Sopranos

Diva Universal 
Being Erica
The Biggest Loser
Brooklyn Nine-Nine
Chicago Fire
Chicago Med
Desperate Housewives 
Dexter
Fairly Legal
Grimm
House
Law & Order
Law & Order: Criminal Intent
Law & Order: Organized Crime
Law & Order: Special Victims Unit
Law & Order: Trial by Jury
Lipstick Jungle
NCIS
Nurse Jackie
Parenthood 
Private Eyes
The Real Housewives franchise
Rizzoli & Isles
Rookie Blue
Royal Pains
Saving Hope
Sleepy Hollow
The Closer
 The Good Wife
 The Librarians
 The Listener

13 Ulica 

 Alarm für Cobra 11 – Die Autobahnpolizei
 Aquarius
 Bates Motel
 Bosch
 Blue Bloods
 Castle
 Chicago Fire
 Chicago P.D. 
 The Closer 
 Cold Case 
 Columbo
 CSI: Crime Scene Investigation
 CSI: Miami
 CSI: NY
 Dexter
 Flashpoint
 Gotham
 Hudson & Rex
 Law & Order
 Law & Order: Criminal Intent
 Law & Order: Special Victims Unit
 Magnum P.I.
 Major Crimes
 Murder, She Wrote
 NCIS: Los Angeles
 NCIS: New Orleans 
 Rookie Blue 
 Stalker 
 White Collar

Terrestrial 
Terrestrial television in Poland broadcasts using a digital DVB-T system. First test DVB-T emission was carried out in Warsaw on 9 November 2001. In April 2004, first DVB-T transmitter near Rzeszów started operation and local TVP division started to market set-top boxes allowing to receive it. 
As of July 2016, there are about 250 DVB-T transmitters operating in Poland, broadcasting up to three multiplexes (except local stations), all using MPEG-4 AVC compression. Six channels, TVP1, TVP2, TVP Info, TVP Sport, TVP Kultura and Antena HD are available in HD across all of Poland, while several others (Polsat, TVN, TVN7 and TTV) broadcast in HD in some local multiplexes.
Analog terrestrial transmissions were terminated in 2013.
In the spring of 2022, the terrestrial TV broadcasting standard was changed across the country to the newer and more effective DVB-T2/HEVC standard, where HEVC (or H.265) is a new standard for TV signal compression.  Switching to the new DVB-T2/HEVC terrestrial TV broadcasting standard was carried out in the period from March to June 2022. First efforts to introduce DVB-T in Poland was made in 1997 in Gdańsk on initiative of TVP (Polish public television broadcaster).

Allocation
At 2006 conference in Geneva known as GE06 Poland received eight DVB-T multiplexes—seven at UHF frequencies 470÷862 MHz (channels 21÷69) and one at VHF frequency 174÷230 MHz (channels 6÷12). Since some of these frequencies are currently used for analog PAL terrestrial television broadcasting, it is possible to run only two nationwide multiplexes (MUX1, MUX2) and one (MUX3) which covers part of country (58% of population). Introduction of all multiplexes will be possible after switching off analog broadcasting.

A government document entitled “Country digitalization schedule”, dated January 2009, set out plan for the digital broadcast switch-on to be made in three steps and analog broadcast switch-off in six steps.

First regular digital broadcast started on 30 September 2010. Analog broadcast switch-off started on 7 November 2012 and the transition to digital broadcasting finished on 23 July 2013.

The period of time between digital broadcast switch-on and analog broadcast switch-off will allow people time to buy new integrated Digital TVs or set-top boxes.

Current status 

MUX1 covers 98.8% of population;
MUX2 covers more than 98.8% of population;
MUX3 covers 99.5% of population;
MUX6 covers more than 90% of population;
MUX8 covers 97.4% of population.

Analog shutdown 

The shutdown of analog broadcast took place in 7 steps between 7 November 2012 and 23 July 2013.

Most operators of analog cable TV are planning to continue providing analog service in their networks for an unspecified period of time.

Additional government actions 

The Polish government created Informative campaigns regarding analog broadcast switch-off in mass media. The government also requires electronic equipment sellers to inform buyers that MPEG-2 TVs and STBs are not compatible with the national standard which is currently DVB-T2 HEVC QAM256 .

The Polish government provides financial help for poor families and seniors to buy a TV - 250 PLN or STB – 100 PLN per household, totaling 475 million PLN.

Technical information 

Polish digital terrestrial television broadcast uses the basic parameters of a digital receiver defined in ETSI TS 101 154 for level 4.1 HDTV: 50 Hz HEVC HDTV 8-bit (resolutions 1920 x 1080 p50, 1280 x 720 p50) MPEG-2 Audio Layer 2 and E-AC -3 audios. 
In the case of a TV receiver capable of displaying UHD , the DVB-T2 receiver also supports the format specified in ETSI TS 101 154 in point 5.14 HEVC HDR UHDTV IRD using HLG10 and HEVC HDR UHDTV IRD using PQ10, Main 10 Profile, Main Tier for UHDTV with resolution 3840 x 2160 and AC-4 audio.

Assignment of channels in multiplexes 

Plan from January 2009 included three nationwide multiplexes with seven SDTV channels in each:
 MUX1 – Free-to-air commercial channels (Polsat, TVN, TV4, TV Puls); after analog broadcast switch-off MUX3 covered the entire country population and public channels moved to it; there was competition for three freed channels;
 MUX2 – open competition
 MUX3 – Public channels; after analog switch-off MUX3 will cover all country population and public channels will be moved to it from MUX1; there will be competition for three freed channels in MUX1.

In January 2010 new plan on introducing DVB-T was presented. Assignment of multiplexes was changed:
 MUX1 – public broadcaster channels (including TVP1, TVP2 and TVP3)
 MUX2 – Commercial free-to-air channels (Polsat, TVN, TV4, TV Puls) plus one additional from each broadcaster.

In June 2010 the final decision on the allocation of multiplexes was made:
 MUX1 – four channels chosen in open competition (were selected: ATM Rozrywka, TTV, Eska TV and Polo TV) and temporary three public broadcaster channels (TVP1, TVP2, TVP3); after analog broadcast switch-off (on July 23, 2013) and after covering MUX3 all country population, public channels have been deleted from MUX1; there was a contest for the remaining four freed channels (were selected: TV Trwam, TVP ABC, Stopklatka TV and Fokus TV);
 MUX2 – four current terrestrial analog commercial free-to-air channels (Polsat, TVN, TV4, TV Puls) plus one additional from each broadcaster, currently: Super Polsat (previously Polsat Sport News), TVN7, TV6 and Puls 2;
 MUX3 – public broadcaster channels (currently six: TVP1, TVP2, TVP3, TVP Info, TVP Kultura, TVP Historia, TVP Sport – earlier TVP Rozrywka).

MUX1

MUX2

MUX3

MUX6

MUX8

Polsat Box "Sport i informacje" ["Sports & informations"]—MUX4 (Pay TV channels)

MUX-L1 (Lubań/Jelenia Góra/Bolesławiec/Chojnów)

MUX-L2 (Ornontowice/Rybnik)

MUX-L3 (Częstochowa/Kamieńsk/Tomaszów Mazowiecki)

MUX-L4 (Świdnica/Wrocław)

MUX-L7 (Lubin/Głogów)

Satellite
In 1998, two DVB-S providers, Cyfra+ and Wizja TV started operation. In 2001, Wizja TV was merged into Cyfra+.

1999 saw the introduction of another platform, Polsat 2 Cyfrowy (later renamed to Polsat Cyfrowy, Cyfrowy Polsat and finally Polsat Box), owned by Polsat, a major Polish commercial TV network. These platforms become very popular, and today, there are no Polish channels available on analogue satellite (the last one, TVN, was switched off in 2008). However, most of the satellite broadcasts in Poland are in SDTV resolution.

On 12 October 2006, ITI launched the n platform with a few HD channels available, as well as—also new to Poland—video on demand functionality. Later, in December 2006, Cyfra+ also started HD broadcasts. Cyfrowy Polsat started HD broadcasts in second half of 2007.

On 21 March 2013, as part of deeper cooperation between Canal+ Group and ITI, Cyfra+ and N were merged into NC+.

On 3 September 2019 NC+ has changed name to Platforma Canal+

Other technologies
Several TV channels, as well as video on demand, are available in Polish mobile telephony networks. There are no currently operating dedicated mobile TV transmitters.

There are also OTT TV service providers.

List of channels 
This is a list of television channels that broadcast in Poland.

Public

Telewizja Polska

Private

Polsat Group

* SD version of the channel available only in the cable

TVN Warner Bros. Discovery

 TVN International—a.k.a. iTVN, for Polish from around the world; New Zealand, USA (New York, Chicago), Germany (Berlin), Australia (Sydney) and Pakistan
 TVN International Extra—a.k.a. iTVN Extra, for Polish from around the world; USA, Germany

Telewizja Puls

Canal+ Polska

* SD version of the channel available only in the cable

BBC Studios

* SD version of the channel available only in the cable

Paramount Networks

* SD version of the channel available only in the cable

The Walt Disney Company

* SD version of the channel available only in the cable

MWE Networks

* SD version of the channel available only in the cable

Others

 * SD version of the channel available only on cable

Planned channels

List of Polonia channels 

Overspill of TV channels from Germany in Poland.

Digital platforms in Poland

Television rating system in Poland

Viewing shares

Top 20 Polish TV channels by Nielsen Media Research (in gray channels, which were in a given year out of the Top 20):

Top 10 most watched TV broadcasts in Poland from 1998 according to Nielsen Media Research:

Research & Development
Advanced Digital Broadcast, with the R&D headquarters based in Zielona Gora, is a Polish company, which introduced many innovations and world's first solutions in the area of Digital TV. One of the co-founders was local professor Janusz C. Szajna.

See also
Lists of television channels

References

External links 
What's On?, Warsaw Voice, 14 February 2003 
 Historia Przemysłowego Instytutu Telekomunikacji przez II wojną światową